Mohammed Kalibat (born 15 June 1990) is an Israeli footballer currently playing for F.C. Kafr Qasim.

Club career

Nazareth Illit
Mohammad started his career in Nazareth Illit Academy and played as a professional too for only one year.

Maccabi Haifa F.C.
on 2009 summer, he signed a three-year contract with Maccabi Haifa and played there for only one year.

Hapoel Acre F.C.
on 2010,after one year with Maccabi Haifa, he was loaned to Hapoel Acre for one year.

Maccabi Netanya F.C.
on 2011, after returning from loan from Hapoel Acre to Maccabi Haifa, he was loaned again to Maccabi Netanya and had successful year there with coach Reuven Atar

Bnei Sakhnin F.C.
After the return from the second loan from Maccabi Netanya to Maccabi Haifa, he was loaned again to Arab side Bnei Sakhnin for one year. In July 2013, after finishing a hard season with Bnei Sakhnin and surviving at the first Division, he was transfers officially to Bnei Sakhnin and signed a two-year contract with the club.

Personal life
Kalibat is Muslim.

References

1990 births
Living people
Israeli footballers
Arab-Israeli footballers
Hapoel Nof HaGalil F.C. players
Maccabi Haifa F.C. players
Hapoel Acre F.C. players
Maccabi Netanya F.C. players
Bnei Sakhnin F.C. players
Maccabi Petah Tikva F.C. players
Hapoel Ra'anana A.F.C. players
Hapoel Umm al-Fahm F.C. players
F.C. Kafr Qasim players
Arab citizens of Israel
Liga Leumit players
Israeli Premier League players
Israel under-21 international footballers
Footballers from Northern District (Israel)
Association football forwards
Association football wingers
Israeli Muslims